I Still Am is the ninth studio album by American rapper Yo Gotti. It was released on October 27, 2017, by Epic Records, Roc Nation and Collective Music Group. The album features guest appearances from Nicki Minaj, Chris Brown, YFN Lucci and Meek Mill, French Montana and 21 Savage. I Still Am serves as a sequel to Gotti's I Am (2013). It was supported by two singles – "Rake It Up" and "Juice". The album debuted at number six on the US Billboard 200 chart, earning 38,000 album-equivalent units in its first week.

Background
On October 10, 2017, Yo Gotti revealed the album's title, release date, tracklist and pre-order. Yo Gotti, in partnership with Tidal will release a documentary in preparation of the album.

Singles
"Rake It Up" featuring Nicki Minaj, was released previously on Yo Gotti's collaborative mixtape Gotti Made-It and serves as the album's lead single. "Juice" was released on October 10, 2017, as a promotional single then sent to radio October 17, 2017, as the second single.

Critical reception

Andy Kellman of AllMusic gave the album three out of five stars, saying " There's nothing particularly novel on this, but it's an adequate addition to the survivor's discography." Sheldon Pearce of Pitchfork said that the album "has more to say about the city he represents than who he actually is", defining the songs "Rake It Up" and "Save It for Me" as standout moments of the album.

Commercial performance
I Still Am debuted at number six on the US Billboard 200 chart, earning 38,000 album-equivalent units (including 19,000 in traditional album sales) in its first week of release. It became Yo Gotti's third consecutive top ten debut on the chart. The album ended up spending a total of 13 weeks. On February 12, 2020, the album was certified gold by the Recording Industry Association of America (RIAA) for combined sales and album-equivalent units of over 500,000 units in the United States.

Track listing

Notes
  signifies an co-producer
 "One on One" features background vocals from Desiigner

Sample credits
 "Rake It Up" contains a sample of "Freaky Tales", written and as performed by Too Short.
 "2908" contains a sample of "How Can I Pretend" as performed by The Continental IV, written by Norman Keith.
 "Oh Yeah" contains a sample of "Choppa Style", as performed by Choppa.

Charts

Certifications

References

2017 albums
Yo Gotti albums
Epic Records albums
Roc Nation albums
Collective Music Group albums
Sequel albums
Albums produced by Mike Will Made It
Albums produced by Southside (record producer)
Albums produced by London on da Track
Albums produced by Zaytoven
Albums produced by Murda Beatz
Albums produced by Drumma Boy